Persoonia amaliae is a species of flowering plant in the family Proteaceae and is endemic to Queensland. It is a shrub or small tree with hairy young branches, spatula-shaped to lance-shaped leaves and yellow flowers in groups of up to eleven.

Description
Young branchlets and leaves have greyish to light brown hairs. Flowering occurs from January to July.

Taxonomy
Persoonia amaliae was first formally described in 1921 by Karel Domin in Bibliotheca Botanica from specimens collected by Amalie Dietrich.

Distribution and habitat

Conservation status
Persoonia amaliae is listed as of "least concern under the Queensland Government Nature Conservation Act 1992''.

References

amaliae
Flora of Queensland
Plants described in 1921
Taxa named by Karel Domin